Marina Seeh (born July 31, 1986 in Bergisch Gladbach) is a Serbian former figure skater. She is a two-time (2010–2011) Serbian national champion.

Programs

Competitive highlights

References

External links 

 
 Marina Seeh at PixieWorld
 Marina Seeh at Tracings

1986 births
Serbian female single skaters
Living people